Scan may refer to:

Acronyms 
 Schedules for Clinical Assessment in Neuropsychiatry (SCAN), a psychiatric diagnostic tool developed by WHO
 Shared Check Authorization Network (SCAN), a database of bad check writers and collection agency for bad checks
 Space Communications and Navigation Program (SCaN)
 Social Cognitive and Affective Neuroscience (journal)
 Scientific content analysis (SCAN), also known as statement analysis

Businesses 
 Scan Furniture, Washington, D.C., US chain
 SCAN Health Plan, not-for-profit health care company based in Long Beach, California
 Scan AB or Scan Foods UK Ltd, the Swedish and UK subsidiaries of the Finnish HKScan Oyj
 Seattle Community Access Network, Seattle, Washington, US TV channel
 Scan (company), a software company based in Provo, Utah, US

Electronics or computer related 
 3D scanning
 Counter-scanning, in physical micro and nanotopography measuring instruments like scanning probe microscope
 Elevator algorithm (also SCAN) disk scheduling algorithm
 Image scanning
 Optical character recognition, optical recognition of printed text or printed sheet music
 Port scanner in computer networking
 Prefix sum is an operation on lists that is also known as the scan operator
 Scan chain, a type of manufacturing test used with integrated circuits
 Graham scan, an algorithm for finding the convex hull of a set of points in the plane
 Scan line
 Screen reading on computers to quickly locate text elements and images
 Raster scan

Medical 
 DMSA scan, a radionuclide scan used in kidney studies
 Medical imaging
 Medical ultrasonography, the medical procedure for examining internal structures, especially when applied to developing foetuses in the womb
 CT scan
 Magnetic resonance imaging, MRI scan
 Switch Access Scanning, a technique that allows users with motor impairments to use a computer using switch access
 Partner assisted scanning, a technique that allows a person with severe disabilities to communicate

Other uses 
 Systems of scansion, the analysis of writing and verse regarding rhythmic and especially metrical structure
 SCAN, a set of tools created by WHO aimed at diagnosing and measuring mental illness
 Scan: Journal of Media Arts Culture, former online journal published by Macquarie University, Sydney, Australia
 SCAN (newspaper), the student newspaper at Lancaster University
 "Scan" (Prison Break episode), an episode of the television series Prison Break
 Scanning (journal), a scientific journal published by Hindawi

See also 
 Scanner (disambiguation)
 Skan (disambiguation)